Albert VI (18 December 1418 – 2 December 1463), a member of the House of Habsburg, was Duke of Austria from 1424, elevated to Archduke in 1453. As a scion of the Leopoldian line, he ruled over the Inner Austrian duchies of Styria, Carinthia and Carniola from 1424, from 1457 also over the Archduchy of Austria until his death, rivalling with his elder brother Emperor Frederick III. According to tradition, Albert, later known as the Prodigal, was the exact opposite of Frederick: energetic and inclined to thoughtlessness.

Biography
Albert was born in Vienna, the son of the Inner Austrian duke Ernest the Iron from his second marriage with the Piast princess Cymburgis of Masovia. Still minors upon the death of their father in 1424, he and his brother remained under the tutelage of their uncle Duke Frederick IV of the Empty Pockets, who ruled over Further Austria and the County of Tyrol.

Coming of age in 1436, Albert, though a junior heir of Inner Austria, received no full rulership anywhere for a long time, which caused friction in his relations with his elder brother Frederick V. When in 1439 both Duke Frederick IV of Further Austria and  King Albert II of Germany, Duke of Austria died, Archduke Frederick assumed the guardianship over their minor sons Sigismund and Ladislaus the Posthumous. As Habsburg patriarch, heir of Inner Austria and regent of Further Austria, Tyrol and the Austria proper, he then ruled over all the dynasty's hereditary lands. At that stage, Albert began quarreling with his brother and in 1446 claimed the lands of Further Austria from him.

The conflict between the brothers escalated when Duke Ladislaus Posthumous of Austria died childless in 1457 and Frederick, Holy Roman Emperor since 1452, came into his inheritance. Albert rose up and in 1458 occupied the western part of the Austrian archduchy "above the Enns" (later known as Upper Austria), which he ruled at Linz as a separate principality (Fürstentum Österreich ob der Enns) and, quite small, his portion of Habsburg patrimony. After laying siege to Frederick in the Vienna Hofburg, he also took over the reign of Austria below the Enns (now Lower Austria) in 1462. Albert however died childless the next year and all his lands fell back to his elder brother.

In 1452 Albert had married Mechthild of the Palatinate, daughter of Count Palatine Louis III. Albert is credited for founding the University of Freiburg in 1457.

Ancestry

Notes

References

Langmaier, Konstantin M. Erzherzog Albrecht VI. von Österreich (1418–1463), Ein Fürst im Spannungsfeld von Dynastie, Regionen und Reich (Forschungen zur Kaiser- und Papstgeschichte des Mittelalters, Beihefte zu J. F. Böhmer, Regesta Imperii 38, Köln, Weimar, Wien 2015. Cf. https://www.researchgate.net/publication/337656429_Whaley_Review_Albrecht_VI_701202

|-
| width="30%" align="center" | Preceded by:Ernest
| width="40%" align="center" | Duke of Inner Austria(Styria, Carinthia, and Carniola)1424–1463with Frederick V
| width="30%" align="center" rowspan="2"| Succeeded by:Frederick V
|-
| width="30%" align="center" | Preceded by:Ladislaus
| width="40%" align="center" | Archduke of Austria1457–1463with Frederick V

1418 births
1463 deaths
15th-century archdukes of Austria
Dukes of Styria
Medieval child monarchs
Burials at St. Stephen's Cathedral, Vienna